Svatojanské proudy ("St John's Rapids") also called Vltavská víla ("The vila of the Vltava") is an opera by Josef Richard Rozkošný to a libretto by .

It was first performed, conducted by Bedřich Smetana, in 1871. It was performed another six times at the Národní divadlo in 1885, and thirty five times in total.

Roles
 Čeněk, Count of Libočany - baritone
 Bořita, a woodsman - bass
 Julie, his daughter - soprano
 Horymír, a miner - tenor
 Vltavka, a vila (fairy) of the Vltava - soprano
 Slavoš, a hunter - bass
 Lidka, friend of Julie - soprano

Recordings
 The 1st Act scene of Čeněk, Julie, her father and chorus was recorded for Czech radio in 1987 and released on a recital CD by Ivan Kusnjer in 2011.

References

Czech-language operas
1871 operas
Operas